The Tracey Fragments is a 2007 Canadian psychological drama film directed by Bruce McDonald and written by Maureen Medved. Based on Medved's 1998 novel of the same name, it stars Elliot Page as Tracey Berkowitz exploring the city in search of her missing brother, presented in a nonlinear narrative and split screen format.

The film premiered at the 57th Berlin International Film Festival, where it was awarded the Manfred Salzgeber Prize for innovative filmmaking.

Plot
Fifteen-year-old Tracey Berkowitz is first seen naked in a tattered shower curtain at the back of a bus, looking for her little brother Sonny, who thinks he's a dog. The film shares its story in choppy, disjointed fragments, telling the story from Tracey's point of view.

Tracey is a caustic, sarcastic, and vulgar teenager, living with her well-meaning but often verbally abusive and neglectful parents. Bullied at her public school, Tracey's closest person to a friend is her homely psychiatrist, Dr. Hecker, who is at first cold to her and doubtful of her perception of the world as accurate. Tracey is seen briefly in a flashback at a police station, while her parents tearfully demand to know where their son is. Tracey reveals that she hypnotized Sonny into behaving like a dog, a game between siblings that actually manifested into Sonny acting like a dog all the time, angering her father, who finds it an annoying phase. Sonny gives Tracey a necklace on her birthday, and he's the only person who Tracey expresses a great deal of affection for. Not long after that, Sonny disappeared during a freak blizzard, something shown to be connected with an older boy Tracey had a crush on called "Billy Zero". She fantasizes about Billy and her in a famous tabloid relationship, in which they run a metalcore band duet with Tracey taking on the stage name "Estuary Palomino" and bleaching her hair blonde.

Tracey's everyday world is shown to involve riding the buses in Manitoba repeatedly, looking for Sonny, having stopped attending classes or living at home. Dr. Hecker becomes more curious about Tracey's strange behaviour, and wonders if she has borderline personality disorder. Tracey recalls in a flashback her father telling her a bedtime story about Sonny's birth as a child. He tells her that Sonny's mother was a dog who died up north, a statement that confuses Tracey. Meanwhile, on the bus, she begins associating with the other lost and homeless people of the city, mostly hipsters and junkies with similar lives to hers and not a lot of money or emotional support. Tracey witnesses physical violence, drug use, sex and alcohol consumption in her new environment. She asks Dr. Hecker if she could rent a room in her house. Dr. Hecker, pitying Tracey, explains that there are ethical boundaries preventing such an arrangement, and she urges Tracey to go home and reconcile with her family. Tracey stays in the apartment of a grown man, Lance, who promises to help her. She becomes fixated on a crow that keeps stopping by a broken window in the building, and she tries to fit in with an older adult crowd. When Tracey is nearly raped in the apartment, she uses a rusty tin can lid to defend herself, escaping with no clothes on, only the flower-print shower curtain around her shoulders that she grabbed from the apartment at the last minute.

A final flashback reveals that, on the night of the blizzard, Tracey was grounded but escaped her house under the guise of "taking Sonny for a walk" while she went to meet Billy. Billy, only interested in hooking up, had sex with Tracey in the back of his car at a deserted park. During this time, Sonny disappeared. It is implied that he fell in the river and drowned. Tracey is devastated. A final fragment shows Tracey wandering naked under her shower curtain, unresponsive, through a Winnipeg park at night. The ground has grass on it, in contrast to the film's mostly winter weather and snow, suggesting a full season has gone by since Sonny's disappearance in the blizzard.

Cast
 Elliot Page as Tracey Berkowitz
 Ari Cohen as Mr. Berkowitz
 Maxwell McCabe-Lokos as Lance
 Erin McMurtry as Mrs. Berkowitz
 Slim Twig as Billy Zero
 Julian Richings as Dr. Heker
 Kate Todd as Debbie Dodge
 Ryan Cooley as David Goldberg
 Libby Adams as Young Tracey Berkowitz
 Zie Souwand as Sonny Berkowitz
 Derek Scott as Headstand Johnny
 Sydney Rodgers as Tracey Berkowitz Imagination
 Stephen Amell as Detective
 George Stroumboulopoulos as himself

Production

McDonald read the book and called it "like a contemporary Catcher in the Rye", and contacted to Medved, who wrote a first draft script that was used in the film. McDonald decided to use multiframe techniques and split screen format with mosaic images, which was inspired by sources as diverse as The Thomas Crown Affair, The Boston Strangler, a Beastie Boys video, and Piet Mondrian's paintings. Using as many as eight frames at once, McDonald wanted to show the fragmented nature of Tracey's mind and offer "windows" into her consciousness, therefore each section of the screen offers a different perspective or camera angle of the same scene.

Casting
McDonald's first choice was Elliot Page, and he originally talked to him when he was 15, the same age as the character. The actor had been recommended to him by Daniel MacIvor and Wiebke von Carolsfeld, the writer and director of the 2002 film in which Page stars, Marion Bridge. At the time, Page said he felt he wasn't quite ready to take on the part, which was described as "a gruelling portrait of a girl suffering from everything from psychiatric abuse to near rape". His decision turned out well, as McDonald wasn't able to raise the financing until Page was a little more grown up.

Filming and editing
Principal photography began in early 2006 as an adaptation of the novel. Filming lasted 14 days over a period of four weeks in the spring of 2006, and took place in Toronto, Brantford, and the suburbs of Hamilton, Ontario. Cinematographer Steve Cosens shot the film on Panasonic DVX100 at 24p frame rate, with 35 mm film stock. Post-production took almost nine months, along with three editors working on two Macs using Apple Final Cut Pro. One particular bloom sequence used all 99 available tracks of Final Cut Pro, generating nearly 200 minutes of running footage inside two minutes of actual running time. Assistant editor Matt Hannam graduated to become the third member of the editing team while working on particularly complex multi-frame transition scenes.

Soundtrack
The score, released on 13 May 2008, is composed by and features music from Canadian indie rock group Broken Social Scene. The soundtrack also features Fembots, Slim Twig, Duchess Says, Rose Melberg and "Land Horses", a cover version of Patti Smith's "Horses" by Land of Talk's Elizabeth Powell.

Release
The Tracey Fragments was selected to open the Panorama section of the 57th Berlin International Film Festival and had its world premiere on February 8, 2007. It was distributed in Canada by Odeon Films, with world sales were handled by Bavaria Films International. It had its North American premiere at the 2007 Toronto International Film Festival on September 12. Canadian theatrical release followed on 2 November 2007. The film was also screened as part of a special series at the Museum of Modern Art on 14 and 18 March 2008. It was acquired for the United States by THINKFilm, and was released May 9, 2008, after its premiere at the AFI Film Festival in Los Angeles in November 2007.

The film was a low-budget production, and grossed $33,183 domestically in 4 theaters.

Critical reception

Review aggregator website Rotten Tomatoes reports that 42% of 38 critic reviews are positive for the film, with an average rating of 5.1/10. The website's critical consensus reads: "Splitscreen intensive and at times ambiguous, this Elliot Page vehicle cum psychodrama takes audacious risks that may confuse." Metacritic calculated a weighted average score of 54 out of 100, based on 10 reviews, citing "mixed or average reviews".

Boston Herald called the film's visuals "fascinating and ambitious", and the narrative is "like origami, folded and refolded upon itself", adding that it "should be seen by anyone interested in the art of film and the art of bravura film acting. It is also a further reminder that Page is the real thing. But we knew that already." A.O. Scott of New York Times wrote "In the hands of a more literal-minded filmmaker The Tracey Fragments might well have been dreary and unbearable, a chronicle of florid self-pity justified by arbitrary cruelty. Instead it is fierce, enigmatic and affecting. While the full range of trauma that befalls Tracey does not seem entirely plausible,  is never less than convincing." V.A. Musetto from New York Post applauded McDonald's "high-octane approach" and Page's "daring performance". Peter Howell of Toronto Star was positive toward the film, praising Page's performance and labeling the film as "a tough watch, but a rewarding one for those open to experimentation." The Playlist started their review by writing that the film "is going to be polarizing in the blogosphere, not so much for the splintered film techniques, but more because of hot-button topic actress  whose role in Juno, seemed to provoke a lot of ire of many a blogger and armchair critic who evidently hates teen girls that deign to speak in pop-cultural tones", opining that the split screen technique was "not obnoxious as it sounds" but it was "both effective and grating at times and will likely make or break the film for audiences." They concluded, "The performances are strong, the visuals are striking and romantic, the music is typically evocative yet subtle, and in spite of the dark premise, it's a lot more funny and playful than it ought to be." Boston Globes Wesley Morris noted that Page was "an amazing combination: the Bizarro Natalie Wood and the Bizarro Wednesday Addams" in a film that "never settles on an emotional tone". Joe Neumaier of New York Daily News gave the film a negative review, referring to the film as "a grating stunt that plays like a film-school project, cutting a bland story into a million tiny irritating pieces". He also stated that Page "needs to drop the smart-aleck Juno bit and act  age." Writing for Reelviews, James Berardinelli wrote "This unexceptional and uninteresting story of a self-pitying borderline-personality teenager verges on being unwatchable as a result of McDonald's decision to bombard the audience with extraneous images in lieu of telling the story."

Ladies and gentlemen,  done it again!" Musgrove found extras to be "more or less passable". In the bottom line, Musgrove wrote "Not for everybody, but relevant to everyone. There isn't a person alive who hasn't felt like the world was falling apart around them, and it is here that we can truly empathize with Tracey. This movie may make certain viewers scratch their heads, but without the daring approach that it took, it would perhaps be nothing compared to what it became. Watch it, if only for Page's fantastic performance." Another DVD review came from The A.V. Clubs Noel Murray, who thought that without the "visual play", the story "wouldn't be all that exceptional" and "McDonald's collage approach is hit-and-miss, there are moments in The Tracey Fragments as exhilarating as any in recent indie cinema."

Accolades
On 11 December 2007, The Tracey Fragments was chosen as one of Canada's Top Ten Films of 2007 by Toronto International Film Festival.

Other media

Tracey: Re-Fragmented
Tracey: Re-Fragmented was a project by the director and producers that was launched on 29 October 2007, and made available all footage from the film shoot and the soundtrack to download and remix into "their own related projects, including music videos, new trailers or to re-edit the entire movie themselves". The footage was released under a Creative Commons license as four torrents, each approximately four gigabytes in size. Registration for the project ended on 31 January 2008. A contest was held for the best use of the footage, with the winner getting an Apple Final Cut Pro software prize pack and the winning material being included on the DVD release, in addition to a video by Ottawa-based punk band Sedatives. This was the first time in the history of cinema that a director made free downloads of a film available to fans concurrent with the film's theatrical release.

Tie-in media
The film and the novel inspired a comic book based on Tracey's adventures beyond the film by Andy Belanger, also titled The Tracey Fragments, that was released to promote the source materials.

Home media
A DVD launch screening in Toronto took place on 6 July 2008 with giveaways, a Q&A with Bruce McDonald, screenings of the Tracey: Re-Fragmented contestants and a sneak peek at McDonald's next film Pontypool, followed by a DVD release in Canada and the US two days later.

Notes

References

External links
 
 Mirror of the Tracey: Re-Fragmented files at the Internet Archive
 
 
 

2007 films
2000s psychological drama films
2007 drama films
2007 independent films
2000s English-language films
English-language Canadian films
Canadian nonlinear narrative films
Films based on Canadian novels
Films directed by Bruce McDonald
Films shot in Toronto
Films shot in Hamilton, Ontario
Films about psychiatry
Films set in Winnipeg
Canadian psychological drama films
Canadian independent films
Films about abuse
Films about runaways
2000s Canadian films